Mugʻlon is an urban-type settlement in Kasbi District of Qashqadaryo Region in Uzbekistan. It is the capital of Kasbi District. Its population is 6,600 (2016).

References

Populated places in Qashqadaryo Region
Urban-type settlements in Uzbekistan